"All the Fun" is a song co-written and recorded by American country music artist Paul Overstreet.  It was released in July 1989 as the third single from his album Sowin' Love. The song reached #5 on the Billboard Hot Country Singles & Tracks chart in November 1989.  It was written by Overstreet and Taylor Dunn.

Chart performance

Year-end charts

References

1989 singles
Paul Overstreet songs
Songs written by Paul Overstreet
Song recordings produced by James Stroud
RCA Records singles
1989 songs